Dove is a small lunar impact crater located in the rugged lunar highlands in the southeastern part of the Moon. It lies to the north of the prominent crater Pitiscus. The crater is named after Prussian physicist Heinrich Wilhelm Dove.

This is a heavily worn and eroded crater with a rim that is overlaid by multiple small craters. In particular the satellite crater Dove C has broken into the southwestern rim and a gap joins the floor of the two formations. The southern rim has been struck by multiple small impacts that form a tight cluster across the rim. There are also several small craters along the northern rim. Dove does have a small interior floor that is relatively level and marked only by a few tiny craterlets.

Satellite craters
By convention these features are identified on lunar maps by placing the letter on the side of the crater midpoint that is closest to Dove.

References

 
 
 
 
 
 
 
 
 
 
 
 

Impact craters on the Moon